Statistics of Portuguese Liga in the 1977–78 season.

Overview
It was contested by 16 teams, and F.C. Porto won the championship. This year was notable for the fact that S.L. Benfica came second despite never losing a match throughout the entire season.

League standings

Results

Season statistics

Top goalscorers

Footnotes

External links
 Portugal 1977-78 - RSSSF (Jorge Miguel Teixeira)
 Portuguese League 1977/78 - footballzz.co.uk
 Portugal - Table of Honor - Soccer Library 
 Portuguese Wikipedia - Campeonato Português de Futebol - I Divisão 1977/1978

Primeira Liga seasons
1977–78 in Portuguese football
Portugal